The King Arthur Companion is an Arthurian encyclopedia, written by Phyllis Ann Karr, with art by Jody Lee, edited and assembled by Chaosium, and published by Reston Publishing in 1983. Subsequent editions expanded the contents, with the name changing in 2001 to The Arthurian Companion. In 2017, a new edition, renamed The Arthurian Concordance was funded as part of a crowdfunding campaign. The King Arthur Companion is a guide to the world of Arthur Pendragon, and is divided into alphabetically-arranged sections for "People", "Places", and "Things".

Publication history
Originating in the research for Greg Stafford's 1979 board game King Arthur's Knights, it eventually saw publication as a separate book in 1993 as an 8.5”x11” hardback with 174 pages.

The 1986 edition was an 8.5”x11” paperback with 174 pages.

The 1997 edition was a digest size paperback with 570 pages and an embossed cover. It was renamed The Arthurian Companion and was the first in the Pendragon fiction line.

The 2001 second edition by Green Knight had its page count increased by 20 pages to 590, and was published as a paperback and hardcover.

An updated edition of The Arthurian Companion will be published by Chaosium in 2022.

Reception
J. Michael Caporula reviewed the Chaosium release of The King Arthur Companion in Space Gamer/Fantasy Gamer No. 77. Caporula commented that "The group of people I most heartily recommend The King Arthur Companion to are the literary 'browsers' of the world, such as myself, who would rather skim through reference works like these than read the actual works themselves. One will surely spend hours enraptured in this tome, given the chance. That a 'dictionary' can stand up to this kind of test is worthy praise indeed."

Reviews
White Wolf #7 (Apr 1987)

References

External links 
 
 Chaosium resources for Pendragon

Fantasy role-playing game supplements
Role-playing game supplements introduced in 1983